Dudusa is a genus of moths in the family Notodontidae. It was first described by Francis Walker in 1865. Moths in genus Dudusa are large, with yellow to ochre forewings and brown hindwings, and show little sexual dimorphism. Species occur in Asia, with the most diversity in Indochina.

Species 
Except where separately referenced, the following species and subspecies are per Schintlmeister 2013:

 Dudusa celebensis Roepke, 1944
 Dudusa distincta Mell, 1922
 Dudusa minor Schintlmeister, 1993
 Dudusa minor expectata Schintlmeister & Lourens, 2010
 Dudusa minor rufa Schintlmeister & Lourens, 2010
 Dudusa nobilis Walker, 1865
 Dudusa nobilis baibarana Matsumura, 1929
 Dudusa obesa Schintlmeister & Fang, 2001
 Dudusa roepkei Schintlmeister 2020
 Dudusa sphingiformis Moore, 1872
 Dudusa synopla Swinhoe, 1907
 Dudusa vethi (Snellen, 1892)
 Dudusa vethi borneensis Roepke, 1944
 Dudusa vethi ferruginea Schintlmeister, 2020
 Dudusa vethi javana Roepke, 1944

References 

Moths described in 1865
Notodontidae